Matla Power Station in Mpumalanga, South Africa, is a coal-fired power plant operated by Eskom and consuming the output from the Matla coal mine.

History 
Construction started in 1974, and the last unit was commissioned in July 1983. It held the world record for the tallest free standing structure to be explosively demolished  for 24 years until the 2006 demolition of the  Westerholt Power Station chimney.

The actual explosion was also used in a gag in Jamie Uys' Funny People 2, where an electrician is instructed to do some wiring, and is warned that improper connection will cause the stack to explode.

See also 

 Eskom
 Fossil-fuel power plant
 List of power stations in South Africa

External links 
 Matla Power Station on the Eskom-Website

References

Coal-fired power stations in South Africa
Towers in South Africa
Chimneys in South Africa
Buildings and structures in Mpumalanga
Economy of Mpumalanga